Toys in the Attic is a 1963 American drama film directed by George Roy Hill and starring Dean Martin, Geraldine Page, Yvette Mimieux,  Gene Tierney and Wendy Hiller. The film is based on a Tony Award-winning play of the same name by Lillian Hellman. The screenplay adaptation is by James Poe, and the original music score was composed by George Duning.

Plot
Julian Berniers returns from Illinois with his young bride Lily Prine to his family in New Orleans. His spinster sisters, Carrie and Anna, welcome the couple, who arrive with expensive gifts. Julian tells them that, though his factory went out of business, he did manage to save money. Although the sisters are skeptical, there is much talk of a long-hoped-for trip to Europe for the two sisters. In fact, Julian has money from a real estate deal that he pulled off with the help of Charlotte Warkins, a former lover, who is now in an abusive marriage.

Carrie is obsessed with her brother. Her jealousy, deriving from her sublimated incestuous desires for her brother, is aimed at Lily. Carrie tricks Lily into informing Charlotte's husband of a rendezvous between Charlotte and Julian, at which Julian was to give Charlotte her half of the money, and Charlotte then was going to leave her husband and flee town. Charlotte's husband sends thugs who beat up Julian, maim Charlotte, and take both halves of the money.

Julian discovers that Carrie manipulated Lily into making the phone call to Charlotte's husband by convincing Lily that Julian and Charlotte were going to leave together. After Carrie hurls insults at Julian and Anna, telling them they will both be failures, both leave the house. Julian finds and reconciles with Lily, and Anna leaves for Europe. Carrie is left alone, deluding herself into thinking they both will return one day.

Cast

Dean Martin as Julian Berniers
Geraldine Page as Carrie Berniers
Yvette Mimieux as Lily Prine Berniers
Gene Tierney as Albertine Prine
Wendy Hiller as Anna Berniers
Nan Martin as Charlotte Warkins
Larry Gates as Cyrus Warkins
Frank Silvera as Henry Simpson

Reception
On review aggregator website Rotten Tomatoes, the film has a rating of 40% based on 5 critics, with an average rating of 4.8/10.

The film recorded a loss of $1.2 million.

The film was nominated for the Best Costume Design (Black & White) Oscar (Bill Thomas), and was nominated for the Best Actress Golden Globe (Geraldine Page) and the Best Supporting Actress Golden Globe (Wendy Hiller).

See also
List of American films of 1963

References

External links

1963 films
1963 drama films
American black-and-white films
American drama films
American films based on plays
Films based on works by Lillian Hellman
Films directed by George Roy Hill
Films produced by Walter Mirisch
Films scored by George Duning
Films set in New Orleans
Films with screenplays by James Poe
Incest in film
Southern Gothic films
United Artists films
1960s English-language films
1960s American films